Francis John Plowden is a former member of the Judicial Appointments Commission.

Plowden is Chairman of the Greenwich Foundation for the Old Royal Naval College. He was a partner at PricewaterhouseCoopers until 2001, where he was responsible for public policy and management work worldwide. He has previously held board positions in the public, private, and voluntary sectors.  He was Chairman of the National Council for Palliative Care until 2008. He was a lay member of the Judicial Appointments Commission from 2006 to 2012.

References

Living people
Year of birth missing (living people)
British businesspeople